Nana Boakye-Yiadom (born 21 February 1983) is a global communications and PR expert with expertise on the African continent. He has over 13 years combined working experience in journalism/media and communications. He is a Ghanaian, and a former international award-winning journalist and media trainer. He was a news presenter, anchor and editor of the Accra-based radio station Citi FM. 

He is also a former Deputy Director of News Programming at the station. Boakye-Yiadom was also the Ghana correspondent for The New York Times, Radio France International (RFI English Service) and Agence France-Presse (AFP) and freelanced for many other international and pan-African media organizations.

Career 
Boakye-Yiadom currently works as the Senior Communications Coordinator for Africa50, the pan-African infrastructure investment platform that is helping to bridge the continent’s infrastructure funding gap, by facilitating project development, mobilizing public and private sector finance, and investing in infrastructure in Africa. Africa50 has 34 African countries, two African Central Banks and the African Development Bank as shareholders. 

Before joining Africa50, Nana Boakye-Yiadom was the Corporate Communications Manager at Guinness Ghana, (Diageo), where his communications team led many initiatives which won awards both in Ghana and across the Diageo markets in Africa. 

While in the UK, he worked with a specialized PR firm, Hyderus, as an Africa Communications Specialist, leading and supporting health communications in Africa for some of the world's major pharmaceutical companies.

As a journalist, he worked for close to 10 years with Citi FM, where he once served as a Deputy Director of News Programming; supervising a news force made up of 45 journalists in Greater-Accra and the other regions across the country. During his active days as a journalist, he was a Ghana correspondent for The New York Times, RFl (English Service) and global news agency AFP. He also had short stints on television as a sports presenter at TV3 in Ghana and as a sports analyst on Metro 

In 2013, his work, "Phone Farming" won the first prize in the African Story Challenge. The story assessed the impact of SMS technology on people's farms and families in Ghana. Additionally, the story won the Best Online Story at the Ghana Journalists Association (GJA) Award in 2013. As result, he got the opportunity to work with the BBC in London for a month to expand his knowledge and work closely with some of the seasoned journalists at the BBC, working with teams that produced some of the flagship BBC programmes like Focus on Africa.  

He was selected as a 2016 Mandela Washington Fellow and studied Civic Leadership at the University of Illinois, Urbana Champaign. Boakye-Yiadom is the founder of iJourno Africa, a not–for profit organization, focused on data journalism training. Following his participation in this fellowship, he co-founded iWatch Africa which is also impacting the continent positively.

Education 
Boakye-Yiadom is a Chevening Scholar with a master's degree in International Public Relations and Global Communications Management from Cardiff University in the UK.

Awards 
 Africa Story Challenge 2014 (Agricultural Cycle)
 Ghana Journalist Association (GJA) Best Online Story 2013
 Young African Leaders Initiative 2016 Fellow

References 

1983 births
Living people
Ghanaian journalists
People from Accra
21st-century journalists